George Edmund Lardner Jr. (August 10, 1934 – September 21, 2019) was an American journalist for The Washington Post who won the Pulitzer Prize for Feature Writing in 1993.

References

1934 births
2019 deaths
20th-century American journalists
American male journalists
21st-century American journalists
Marquette University alumni
Journalists from New York City
Pulitzer Prize for Feature Writing winners
The Washington Post journalists
People from Brooklyn